The Inner Mongolian People's Republic was a state in Inner Mongolia founded shortly after the Second World War. It existed from 9 September 1945 until 6 November 1945.

History 
During the Second Sino-Japanese War, the Japanese established a puppet state in Inner Mongolia called Mengjiang. Mengjiang was disbanded by the invasion of Soviet and Mongolian troops in August 1945. On 9 September 1945, a congress of "People's Representatives" was held in what is now the Sonid Right Banner. The congress was attended by representatives, 80 of them, from the Chahar, Xilingol, and Siziwang areas. The congress proclaimed the Inner Mongolian People's Republic, and a provisional government of 27 members were elected, of whom 11 were in the Standing Committee.

The Chinese Communist Party took notice of the government, fearing separatism. The CCP sent Ulanhu to take control of the situation, and he ordered the Inner Mongolian government to be dissolved. The region was organized later as the Inner Mongolian Autonomous Region.

See also 
 Mongolian People's Republic in Outer Mongolia

References

External links 
 History of the interim government of the Inner Mongolian People's Republic  
 锡察地区的民族自治运动 

Former countries in Chinese history
History of Inner Mongolia
Inner Mongolian independence movement
1945 in China
Communist states
Former socialist republics